

Medalists

Kata

Men's combat

Women's combat

Medal table

External links
  2011 Southeast Asian Games

2011 Southeast Asian Games events
2011
Asian Games, Southeast
2011 Asian Games, Southeast